Scott Crichton may refer to:

 Scott Crichton (judge) (born 1954), member of the Louisiana Supreme Court
 Scott Crichton (American football) (born 1991), American football defensive end 
 Scott Crichton (rugby union) (born 1954), New Zealand rugby union player